Francis Augustus  Wright (1 August 1835 – 1 October 1903) was a merchant sailor, gold miner, carrier and member of the Parliament of New South Wales.

Early life
Wright was born in London, England to Eliza . His father, also named Frances Augustus Wright, was a Captain of the Royal Navy, and the family emigrated to New South Wales in 1836. Wright went to sea as an apprentice, returning to Australia in 1852 and working in the gold fields of Victoria and New South Wales for three years. He married Alice Marcia Williams on 19 December 1864.

Politics
In 1873 Wright was elected as an alderman for the Municipality of Redfern, serving until 1887, including a period as He became Mayor of Redfern from February 1882 until February 1885. At a by-election in 1882 he was elected as a member for Redfern in the New South Wales Legislative Assembly, He was a friend of Henry Copeland and both were appointed ministers in the Stuart ministryfrom January 1883, with Wright being allocated the portfolio of Postmaster-General. Copeland was forced to resign two months later and in May 1883 Wright was allocated Copeland's former portfolio of  Secretary for Public Works,holding it until October 1885, when he joined the Dibbs ministry, and held office as Secretary for Mines until his defeat for Redfern in October 1885.

Both Wright and Copeland were committed free traders, however both altered their positions, becoming members of the Protectionist Party. Wright returned to politics as a Protectionist candidate for Glen Innes, winning the seat at the 1889 election, and retaining it until his death.

He was a commissioner for New South Wales for the international exhibitions in London in 1886 and Chicago in 1893.

Wright died in Ryde, Sydney on 1 October 1903 (aged 68). Alice and he had 5 daughters and 5 sons and he was survived by Alice, 3 daughters and 2 sons.

See also

References

 

Australian miners
Australian Anglicans
English emigrants to colonial Australia
Members of the New South Wales Legislative Assembly
Free Trade Party politicians
Mayors of Redfern
1835 births
1903 deaths
19th-century Australian politicians